The Frauen DFB-Pokal 2006–07 was the 27th season of the cup competition, Germany's second-most important title in women's football. The first round of the tournament was held on 2–3 September 2006. In the final which was held in Berlin on 26 May 2007 FFC Frankfurt defeated FCR 2001 Duisburg 5–2 on penalties, thus claiming their sixth title.

1st round

* The game was replayed due to a referee's mistake in the penalty shootout.

Replay

2nd round

The best nine teams from the 2005–06 Bundesliga season entered the competition in this round. Defending champion Turbine Potsdam had a quick exit from the competition, losing their initial match at home against FCR 2001 Duisburg.

3rd Round

Quarter-finals

Semi-finals

Final

References

DFB-Pokal Frauen seasons
Pokal
Fra